RAP4 is a manufacturer of  paintball markers, paintball equipment, tactical gear and training tools.

History

In 2002, RAP4 began as a small company that brought a new type of marker to the paintball industry by distribution of R.A.M (real action marker) by APS Airgun Limited (a worldwide supplier for military training and Real Action Game equipment).

First marker

RAP4 started as a home business and sold a .43 caliber R.A.M. paintball gun rebranded after the company, the RAP4. The RAP4 used a smaller version of the standard .68-caliber paintball, the measurement was .43. The .43-caliber paintball was encased in an alloy, and when the paintball was fired, the casing would eject from the port while the paintball was projected from the barrel. This marker was designed after and was a replica of the M4. This marker featured an air system in the back of the marker, inside the butt stock, thus removing an air tank on the bottom of the standard paintball markers. This was the first of its kind in the paintball world.
The other unique quality of the marker was that it used a 20-round magazine instead of the standard paintball hopper to chamber paintballs. By using the magazine to feed paintballs, this made it possible to replicate the M4. The R.A.M. was the first marker to utilize a magazine.

Products

468 

The next level in Mil-Sim and tactical training markers that replicates the function and feel of M4 and AR15 family of rifles.

T68 paintball marker 
The T68 marker debuted with the first generation in 2004, and has since had seven revisions.  It is a .68-caliber semi-automatic and full auto CO2 or HPA (high pressure air) powered paintball marker.  Besides standard paintball play, the marker is also used for military simulation (MilSim), and law enforcement training. as the marker physically resembles an M16 and M4 U.S. Military assault rifle and carbines.  The markers provide crowd control and are an alternative method for subduing individuals; the markers can fire .68 caliber Less Lethal Live Rounds, more commonly known as pepper balls - live rounds filled with powder substance that irritates the eyes and nose, similar to pepper spray.

The T68 core is a design similar in action to the Spyder markers. Primary systems (Barrel, Air System, Feed System & Trigger) attach to the core. Additional external components add to the overall M-4 look.  These include a carry handle (fixed or removable with RIS weaver rail), T-charging (cocking) handle (Gen 3 upwards), pistol grip with trigger guard, faux clip housing with working magazine release, fake magazine with hollow interior (for storage), M-4 handguard assembly with interchangeable front handguards, M-4 forward sight with bayonet lug and sling loop, and either 3-position M4 Carbine or fixed M-16A2 style stock.  Various barrel lengths and styles are available, from 1" through 20", with interchangeable muzzle flash suppressors or faux silencers.  The barrels use Spyder threads, so aftermarket barrels are also capable of being used.  Made from machined aircraft aluminum, the marker is mechanical, with no electronic parts in its factory form.  A screw is provided under the stock for adjustment of the shooting velocity, and a simple push-safe safety is situated just ahead of the trigger on the core.

The sixth generation and later models feature changes to the marker core and body to accept a working 18-round magazine. They eliminate the gap between the trigger and the magazine receiver, allowing the trigger finger to reach the magazine release button for tactical reload.  The air system is internal and allows the unit to be self-contained.

The T68 can use any weaver-mounted accessory and can be made into any configuration of the M-16/M4 Carbine, as well as working M203 grenade launchers, that can be mounted on the marker.  There are also AK-47 stocks and handguards, and MP5 accessories, allowing custom configurations.

Split Fire Dual Feed system

RAP4 also has a hopper- fed system. Its newest design is the Split Fire Dual Feed System. This is compatible only with the T68, M4 and AK47 and allows use of both a hopper and a magazine.
The Split Fire adapter is installed inside the T68, and when the user turns a dial the marker switches from feeding from the magazine to the hopper, and vice versa.

M80 Landmine

The M80 Landmine is pressure activated and fires a variety of liquids and powders. The reusable M80 Landmine is powered by a rechargeable CO2 reservoir that disperses more than two ounces of smoke-simulation powder or liquid paint, creating a twenty-foot blast radius.
The RAP4 reusable M80 Landmine is used for paintball and the military combat training. The mine is light and compact, and it can be concealed as a booby trap. As an antipersonnel training device, the M80 can be used with smoke-simulation powder to leave a residue and cloud or liquid paint for a distinguishing mark. The mine will “detonate” with 10 lbs of pressure and will produce a loud explosion. It may be used on its side or vertically, buried with the top exposed or incorporated into a wide variety of realistic booby-trap setups.

Xpower 

The XPower is an exact match of the M4 Carbine. It is the same length, weight, look and functionality. The paintball version shoots .43-caliber paintballs. This marker ejects a cartridge after each shot, just like real assault rifles.
It shoots .43-caliber paintballs, which are loaded into alloy or biodegradable plastic shells, which eject after every shot. The paintballs used for this marker are smaller than the standard .68-caliber that most markers use.

T68 M249 Magazine 

The T68 M249 Magazine is designed after the real M249 magazine for the Squad Automatic Weapon; this magazine holds 200 .68-caliber paintballs, like most hoppers. Unlike a hopper. though, this magazine feeds from beneath the marker. The magazine is battery-operated and is force-fed into the chamber of the marker prior to each shot. This magazine is currently compatible only with the T68 markers.

T68 AK47 Gen6 

Another product of the T68 production line is, the T68 AK47. RAP4 completed its scenario and realism focus by producing the two most common assault rifle, just in a paintball gun version. The M16 and AK47 are both available for purchase as a paintball marker.
The T68 Gen6 AK47 features an all-metal construction with the RAP4 internal Flexi Air System. Each unit incorporates a magazine-feed system with an 18-round detachable magazine.
The AK47 Paintball Gun is designed for scenario paintball and for military training.

RAP4 products in use 

Many military installations, police departments and Federal Agencies use RAP4 products, below is an example of some of those:
Fort Bragg, N.C.
Fort Huachuca, Ariz.
Fort McClellan, Al.
Fort Leonard Wood, Mo
Fort Bliss, Texas/ N.M
United States Department of Homeland Security
United States Department of Transportation
New York City Police Department
Bureau of Indian Affairs
San Mateo Police Department

References

Notes 

 https://web.archive.org/web/20090924004819/http://www.pbreview.com/products/reviews/3130/
 https://web.archive.org/web/20090830061736/http://www.rap4.com/paintball/os/

External links 
 
 Asia Paintball Services

Companies established in 2002
Manufacturing companies based in San Jose, California
Paintball equipment manufacturers
2002 establishments in California